Krushnaji Pandurang Kulkani (Devanagari: कृष्णाजी पांडुरंग कुलकर्णी) (1893–1964) was a Marathi writer from Maharashtra, India.

In 1952, he presided over Marathi Sahitya Sammelan, which was held in Amalner.

The following is a partial list of Kulkarni's works:
 Marathi Bhasha Udgam Va Vikas (मराठी भाषा उद्गम व विकास)
 Marathi Vyutpatti Kosh (मराठी व्युत्पत्तिकोश) 
 Rajwade Marathi Dhatu Kosh  (राजवाडे मराठी धातुकोश) (Editor)
 Maharashtra Gatha (महाराष्ट्र गाथा) (Co-editor: Prahlad Keshav Atre)

Marathi-language writers
Writers from Maharashtra
1893 births
1964 deaths
Presidents of the Akhil Bharatiya Marathi Sahitya Sammelan